Third Set is a live album by pianist Cedar Walton recorded in Denmark in 1977 and released on the Danish SteepleChase label.

Reception

Allmusic awarded the album 3 stars. The Penguin Guide to Jazz commented that the album "sounds a little ragged".

Track listing 
All compositions by Cedar Walton except where noted.
 "Angel in the Night" (Billy Higgins) – 12:38    
 "Bolivia" – 12:39    
 "Fantasy in D" – 9:56    
 "Blue Monk" (Thelonious Monk) – 6:12    
 "Rhythm-a-Ning" (Monk) – 9:46

Personnel 
Cedar Walton – piano 
Bob Berg – tenor saxophone
Sam Jones – bass
Billy Higgins – drums

References 

Cedar Walton live albums
1983 live albums
SteepleChase Records live albums
Albums recorded at Jazzhus Montmartre